Intromission may refer to:

 Sexual intercourse (colloquial)
 Copulation (zoology)
 Intromission theory, a theory of visual perception
 Vicious intromission, a concept in Scottish law

See also
 intermission (disambiguation)
 Intromittent organ